Antonijo is a Croatian and Slovene given name. Notable people with this name include the following:

Antonijo Ježina (born 1989), Croatian football
Antonijo Pranjič (born 1985), Slovenian footballer
Antonijo Zupan (born 1976), Croatian footballer

See also

Antonija
Antonije
Antonijs
Antonino (name)
Antonio
Antoñito (name)

Notes

Croatian masculine given names
Slovene masculine given names